Cylindrosporium is a genus of parasitic fungi. The genus includes several plant pathogens that cause leaf spot.

External links

References 

Fungal plant pathogens and diseases
Dermateaceae